The Sibagat River is a stream located in Sibagat, Agusan del Sur, Caraga Region, Philippines. It is a tributary of the larger Wawa River with headwaters located in the northeastern mountain boundaries of Sibagat and Butuan.

Etymology

The Sibagat River is named after its town's name Sibagat that comes from the word bagat which means meet or meeting place. According to oral history, the Sibagat River is the place where warring tribes met and fought. The losing tribe would retreat downstream to the Wawa River and disappear.

Geography

The Sibagat River headwaters originate from the hinterlands of Barangay Pianing in Butuan and traverses along the riverbank barangay of Bugsukan, also in Butuan, and the barangays of Tabontabon, Afga, El Rio, Mahayahay and Poblacion in Sibagat where its mouth located in Sitio Sabang met with the larger Wawa River. The Wawa River is the largest river in the town and a tributary river to the Agusan River.

Crossings

There are three permanent bridges that cross the Sibagat River
 Camponay Bridge – Brgy. Tabontabon, connecting the road linking NRJ-Tabontabon to Sta. Maria-Sta. Cruz-Banagbanag-Perez Road
 Mahayahay Bridge – Brgy. Mahayahay, connecting the road linking NRJ-Mahayahay to Del Rosario-San Isidro-Magsaysay-Banagbanag-New Tubigon-Tandag Road
 Sibagat Bridge – Brgy. Poblacion, a steel bridge connecting the road linking NRJ-Sibagat to Villangit-San Isidro-Magsaysay-Banagbanag-New Tubigon-Tandag Road

Tributaries 

 Tambagoko River

See also

Agusan River
Wawa River (Agusan del Sur)
Tambagoko River
Boguko River
Andanan River
Sibagat, Agusan del Sur
Agusan del Sur Province
List of rivers of the Philippines

References

Rivers of the Philippines
Geography of Agusan del Sur
Landforms of Agusan del Sur